Akagera National Park is a protected area in eastern Rwanda covering  along the international border with Tanzania. It was founded in 1934 and includes savannah, montane and swamp habitats. The park is named for the Kagera River which flows along its eastern boundary feeding into Lake Ihema and several smaller lakes. The complex system of lakes and linking papyrus swamps makes up over a third of the park, which is the largest protected wetland in Eastern-Central Africa.

History 

Akagera National Park was founded in 1934 by the Belgian government, which at the time occupied Rwanda. The park was  large and was known for its biodiversity.

Akagera used to have a large population of African wild dogs. At one point, it was known as the 'Parc aux Lycaons' and wild dogs were so abundant, that the Belgian government considered them a pest. However, a disease epidemic diminished the population and the last wild dogs were seen in 1984.

In 1957, black rhinos were introduced from Tanzania. In the 1970s, more than 50 black rhinos lived in the savannah-habitat of the park. Due to widespread poaching, the population declined over the following decades, and the last confirmed sighting was in 2007. In 1986, Masai giraffes were introduced from Kenya. Their population has grown to over 80 individuals in recent years. Around 1990, Akagera was known to have a population of 250 to 300 lions. In the years following the Rwandan Civil War, the entire population was killed by farmers who returned to Rwanda after the War and settled in the park.

In 2009 the Rwanda Development Board (RDB) and the African Parks Network entered into a 20-year renewable agreement for the joint management of Akagera. The Akagera Management Company was formed in 2010 as the joint management body for Akagera National Park. Over the next 5 years a $10 million expenditure was carried out in the national park area, with financial help from the Howard Buffett Foundation. The aim was to increase the security of the national park and to reintroduce locally extinct species. Security measures that were taken include: the construction of a western boundary fence which measures , deploying an air surveillance helicopter, training of an expert rhino tracking and protection team and a canine anti-poaching unit.

In July 2015, seven lions from South Africa were introduced and released in the park, making them the first lions in Rwanda for 15 years. AndBeyond donated five lionesses from Phinda Private Game Reserve and Tembe Elephant Park in KwaZulu-Natal donated two male lions. This effort was described by African Parks as "a ground-breaking conservation effort for both the park and the country" as part of a project aimed at reversing the local extinction of the species in Akagera National Park. Since 2015, the lion population has grown to almost 40 animals and it keeps thriving.

In May 2017, a joint operation between the Rwanda Development Board and African Parks saw the reintroduction of 18 Eastern black rhinoceroses from South Africa, which had been absent for 10 years. With the reintroduction of black rhinos and lions, the national park is now home to all of Africa's "big five": lion, African leopard, African bush elephant, rhinoceros, and African buffalo.

During June 2019, Akagera received a further 5 eastern black rhinoceros from 3 different zoos in 3 different countries located across Europe. The zoos include Dvur Kralove zoo from the Czech Republic, Flamingo Land from the UK and Ree Park Safari from Denmark. This relocation is the first of its kind, as something like this between Europe and Africa never happened before. The 2 males and 3 females were safely delivered to the park after a 30 hour journey. These mammals are direct descendants from rhinos taken from Africa during the colonial days.

In November 2021, 30 white rhinos were successfully translocated to Akagera from Phinda Private Game Reserve in South Africa, in the largest single rhino translocation ever taken. This translocation aimed to extend the species' range and create a new breeding stronghold in Rwanda.

The large mammal population has increased since 2010, from 4000 animals in 2010 to over 13,500 in 2018.

Tourism 
Since African Parks assumed management of the park in partnership with the Rwanda Development Board in 2010, tourism has dramatically increased. In 2010, 8,000 people visited the park. This number rose to 44,000 by 2018. This increase has allowed Akagera to become 80% self-sustaining and therefore less reliant on donors.

See also 
 Mutara Game Reserve, an adjacent former protected area
 Serengeti

References

External links 

African Parks (organisation)
Eastern Province, Rwanda
National parks of Rwanda
Protected areas established in 1934
Victoria Basin forest–savanna mosaic
Important Bird Areas of Rwanda